Kalaa Dheke Varah Loabivey is a Maldivian television series developed for Television Maldives by Mohamed Manik. The series stars Manik, Sheela Najeeb, Ibrahim Jihad and Aminath Ameela in main roles. The series follows two best friends who gets attracted to an outsider who visits their island for Eid holiday and what ensues in a game of love and defeat. It marks the directorial debut of Manik in a television series.

Cast

Main
 Mohamed Manik as Fazeel
 Sheela Najeeb as Nadha
 Ibrahim Jihad as Nihan
 Aminath Ameela as Yumna

Recurring

 Mohamed Shiyam
 Ismail Shimal
 Mohamed Raqib
 Muawiyath Idhurees
 Mohamed Yamaan
 Mohamed Ahulam
 Ahmed Riyaz
 Shujau

 Nasreena Ali Firaq
 Shaanee
 Sobira
 Zakiyya
 Shifana
 Haleema
 Majeedha
 Majudha

Episodes

Soundtrack

Response
Upon release, the series received mainly positive reviews from critics and audience, where the writing, direction and performance of the actors were highlighted.

References

Serial drama television series
Maldivian television shows